Lee Jae-won (born 21 February 1997) is a South Korean football forward, who plays for Seongnam FC in the K League 1, South Korea's top-tier professional football league.

Club career
Born on 21 February 1997, Lee joined Seongnam FC in 2019. He made his debut for the club on 2 November 2019, playing in a K League 1 match against Suwon. He scored his first goals just a few weeks later, making a pair against Jeju United.

Club career statistics

Notes

External links
Player profile on Seongname FC website (in Korean)

1997 births
Living people
Association football forwards
South Korean footballers
Seongnam FC players
K League 1 players